Muhammad Saleem Kalmati is a Pakistani politician who has been a member of the Provincial Assembly of Sindh since August 2018.

Political career

He was elected to the Provincial Assembly of Sindh as a candidate of Pakistan Peoples Party (PPP) from Constituency PS-89 (Malir-III) in 2018 Pakistani general election. He received 23,923 votes and defeated Syed Ali Hussain, a candidate of Pakistan Tehreek-e-Insaf (PTI).

References

Living people
Pakistan People's Party MPAs (Sindh)
Year of birth missing (living people)